WSNR (620 AM) is a commercial radio station, licensed to Jersey City, New Jersey, and serving the New York metropolitan area.  It airs a brokered time radio format. The station is co-owned by Gregory Davidzon and Sam Katsman, through licensee Davidzon Radio, Inc.  Davidzon is a Russian-American media mogul who also publishes a weekly newspaper under his name.  Weekday programming consists of Russian pop music and talk shows as "Davidzon Radio," named after the station's co-owner.  Nighttime and weekend hours are leased to various ethnic and specialty programmers.  During part of the weekend, the station airs a Caribbean format, "One Caribbean Radio."

Broadcast signal
WSNR is unusual in that it runs more power at night than in the daytime, the reverse of many AM radio stations. It transmits with 3,000 watts days and 7,600 watts nights, from five nearly in-line towers in Lyndhurst, New Jersey. The signal is directed at Midtown Manhattan, as a consequence of protection requirements to adjacent-channel stations to the northeast and southwest of the transmitter site. (WTEL 610 Philadelphia and WPRO 630 Providence, Rhode Island are both powered at 5,000 watts.)

With WSNR's signal pattern, the Bronx, Brooklyn and Queens are well-covered, as is Nassau County, New York, although some of New York's northern and southern suburbs are not. This is the second transmitter site for this station. As WVNJ, licensed to Newark, New Jersey, it was powered at 5,000 watts day and night, but with separate antenna patterns from a tower site in Livingston, New Jersey, near Route 10.

History

The WVNJ years
WVNJ first signed on the air December 7, 1948. It was licensed to Newark and owned by the Newark Broadcasting Company, a subsidiary of the Griffith Piano Company, to showcase its instruments. In the 1950s through 1970s, the station played Broadway and Hollywood show tunes as well as instrumental and vocal easy listening music. In 1961, then-owner Herb Saltzman acquired the license to 100.3 MHz, formerly WMGM-FM, which had been terminated in 1955. At first, Saltzman simulcast both stations, however in a few years, WVNJ-FM became an instrumental-based beautiful music station.

WVNJ AM 620 had evolved into an all-adult standards format by the early 1970s, playing artists such as Frank Sinatra, Benny Goodman, Mills Brothers, Barbra Streisand, Tony Bennett, Ella Fitzgerald, Ray Charles, Andrews Sisters, Nat "King" Cole, Peggy Lee, Artie Shaw, The Carpenters, Vic Damone, Sammy Davis Jr., Connie Francis, Patti Page, Johnny Mathis and Dinah Shore. In 1980, when 106.7 WRVR (now WLTW) New York dropped Jazz programming to become Country WKHK, WVNJ-FM adopted a night-time jazz format, keeping its daytime easy listening format of instrumentals and usually three vocals per hour.

At that point, WVNJ 620 picked up the beautiful music format for night-time hours while keeping big bands and adult standards during the day. Ratings were low on WVNJ 620 due to the fact it had a weak signal and AM 1130 WNEW was also doing an adult standards format by 1981.

Spanish Broadcasting System
In August 1983, WVNJ-FM was sold to the Malrite Communications Group and became Top 40 "Z 100" WHTZ.  AM 620 WVNJ was sold that October to the Spanish Broadcasting System (SBS).  The station switched to a Spanish-language adult contemporary format as WSKQ.  It moved to studios in Manhattan.  After SBS bought an FM station, the WSKQ call sign switched to FM 97.9.  AM 620 became WXLX and aired a Regional Mexican music format beginning in 1990.

Sports radio
In 1997, the station was sold to One On One Sports, and it became WJWR as a full time sports radio outlet. After One on One Sports merged with the Sporting News newspaper, the network was renamed Sporting News Radio, and the call letters were then changed to WSNR.

In 2001, the station was acquired by Rose City Radio.  Several New Jersey political leaders noted that Jersey City was the largest city in the nation without a commercial AM, FM to TV station.  So around 2002, WSNR was re-licensed to Jersey City, coupled with a request for more nighttime power.  WJWR, and later WSNR, was the flagship station for the New York Islanders hockey team, and at various times carried the play by play for the New York Liberty of the Women's National Basketball Association (WNBA), the New York CityHawks of the Arena Football League, and the Brooklyn Cyclones baseball team of the New York–Penn League.

From 2001 to 2006, the station was owned by Paul Allen's Vulcan Ventures. Despite the ownership change, it retained the station's affiliation with Sporting News Radio. The station was also briefly a Motor Racing Network (MRN) affiliate and was the only New York metro area station broadcasting NASCAR events. During this time, the station began selling blocks of time to independent producers while still airing sports the other hours of the day. From 10 a.m. to 3 p.m. weekdays, WSNR featured a big band show produced and hosted by Danny Stiles, playing only music from the 1920s, 1930s, 1940s and early 1950s.

Russian and ethnic programming
Gregory Davidzon and Sam Katsman, through licensee Davidzon Radio, Inc. purchased WSNR for $12.5 million in a transaction that was consummated on March 31, 2015.  The new owners switched WSNR to Russian-language programming, with blocks of time at night and on weekends airing Caribbean, Black Gospel, Jewish, and Catholic programing.

Orthodox Jewish talk radio host Zev Brenner uses WSNR for his Talkline Communications network.

References

External links
Davidzon Radio
Radio Maria New York (English with streaming audio)

SNR
Mass media in Hudson County, New Jersey
Russian-American culture in New Jersey
Russian-language radio stations in the United States
Radio stations established in 1947
1947 establishments in New Jersey
SNR